= 2011 Abia State House of Assembly election =

The 2011 Abia State House of Assembly election was held on April 26, 2011, to elect members of the Abia State House of Assembly in Nigeria. All the 24 seats were up for election in the Abia State House of Assembly.

== Results ==
=== Osisioma South ===
PDP candidate Emeka Alozie won the election.

2011 Abia State House of Assembly election
Party	Candidate	Votes	%
PDP	Emeka Alozie		
PDP hold			

=== Umuahia North ===
PDP candidate Emeka Ejiogu won the election.

2011 Abia State House of Assembly election
Party	Candidate	Votes	%
PDP	Emeka Ejiogu		
PDP hold			

=== Umuahia Central ===
PDP candidate Grace Nkera Uche won the election.

2011 Abia State House of Assembly election
Party	Candidate	Votes	%
PDP	Grace Nkera Uche		
PDP hold			

=== Isiala Ngwa North ===
PDP candidate Martins Azubuike won the election.

2011 Abia State House of Assembly election
Party	Candidate	Votes	%
PDP	Martins Azubuike		
PDP hold			

=== Isiala Ngwa South ===
PDP candidate Darlington Nwokocha won the election.

2011 Abia State House of Assembly election
Party	Candidate	Votes	%
PDP	Darlington Nwokocha		
PDP hold			

=== Isuikwuato ===
PDP candidate Chukwudi Ogele won the election.

2011 Abia State House of Assembly election
Party	Candidate	Votes	%
PDP	Chukwudi Ogele		
PDP hold			

=== Umuahia East ===
PDP candidate Chidiebere Nwoke won the election.

2011 Abia State House of Assembly election
Party	Candidate	Votes	%
PDP	Chidiebere Nwoke		
PDP hold			

=== Umunneochi ===
PDP candidate Ikedi Ezekwesiri won the election.

2011 Abia State House of Assembly election
Party	Candidate	Votes	%
PDP	Ikedi Ezekwesiri		
PDP hold			

=== Ukwa West ===
PDP candidate Mezie Nwaubani won the election.

2011 Abia State House of Assembly election
Party	Candidate	Votes	%
PDP	Mezie Nwaubani		
PDP hold			

=== Ukwa East ===
PDP candidate Allwell Asiforo Okere won the election.

2011 Abia State House of Assembly election
Party	Candidate	Votes	%
PDP	Allwell Asiforo Okere		
PDP hold			

=== Obingwa East ===
PDP candidate Princewill Chilaka won the election.

2011 Abia State House of Assembly election
Party	Candidate	Votes	%
PDP	Princewill Chilaka		
PDP hold			

=== Obingwa West ===
PDP candidate Uche Nwankpa won the election.

2011 Abia State House of Assembly election
Party	Candidate	Votes	%
PDP	Uche Nwankpa		
PDP hold			

=== Umuahia South ===
PDP candidate Chidi Nwosu won the election.

2011 Abia State House of Assembly election
Party	Candidate	Votes	%
PDP	Chidi Nwosu		
PDP hold			

=== Ikwuano ===
PDP candidate Emeka Osoagbaka won the election.

2011 Abia State House of Assembly election
Party	Candidate	Votes	%
PDP	Emeka Osoagbaka		
PDP hold			

=== Ugwunagbo ===
PDP candidate Humphery Azubuike won the election.

2011 Abia State House of Assembly election
Party	Candidate	Votes	%
PDP	Humphery Azubuike		
PDP hold			

=== Ohafia North ===
PDP candidate Ude Oko Chukwu won the election.

2011 Abia State House of Assembly election
Party	Candidate	Votes	%
PDP	Ude Oko Chukwu		
PDP hold			

=== Aba Central ===
PDP candidate Kate Maduako won the election.

2011 Abia State House of Assembly election
Party	Candidate	Votes	%
PDP	Kate Maduako		
PDP hold			

=== Osisioma North ===
PDP candidate Ikechukwu Nwabeke won the election.

2011 Abia State House of Assembly election
Party	Candidate	Votes	%
PDP	Ikechukwu Nwabeke		
PDP hold			

=== Aba North ===
PDP candidate Blessing Nwagba won the election.

2011 Abia State House of Assembly election
Party	Candidate	Votes	%
PDP	Blessing Nwagba		
PDP hold			

=== Arochukwu ===
PDP candidate Agwu U. Agwu won the election.

2011 Abia State House of Assembly election
Party	Candidate	Votes	%
PDP	Agwu U. Agwii		
PDP hold			

=== Aba South ===
PDP candidate Nwogu Iheasinmo won the election.

2011 Abia State House of Assembly election
Party	Candidate	Votes	%
PDP	Nwogu Iheasinmo		
PDP hold			

=== Bende North ===
PDP candidate Ndukwe Ojukwu won the election.

2011 Abia State House of Assembly election
Party	Candidate	Votes	%
PDP	Ndukwe Ojukwu		
PDP hold			

=== Bende South ===
PDP candidate Princewill Onyegbu won the election.

2011 Abia State House of Assembly election
Party	Candidate	Votes	%
PDP	Princewill Onyegbu		
PDP hold			

=== Ohafia South ===
PDP candidate Mba Ukaha won the election.

2011 Abia State House of Assembly election
Party	Candidate	Votes	%
PDP	Mba Ukaha		
PDP hold			
